Professor Witold Skulicz (12 February 1926 in Kraków – 28 December 2009) was a Polish artist.

Founder and President of International Print Triennial Society in Kraków. The initiator of International Print Biennial and Triennial. For many years a Dean of Department of Graphic Arts and a Head of Graphic Project Studio at Academy of Fine Art in Kraków. Meritorious member of ZPAP.

The author of programmes promoting Polish print: Polish Eagles, Icon Data, The Best Diploma. The initiator and coeditor of electronic publication series “Directory of Print – CD ROM”, anthology of Polish Print “Polish Print 1950–2000 Winners of International Exhibitions”. The initiator of International Print Network Kraków – Vienna – Oldenburg. The theorist of contemporary print. An organizer and curator of hundreds of exhibitions. A juror of the most important print competition in the world, among others: Bradford, Yvaskyla, Frechen, Fredrikstad.

His works were presented at over 80 group exhibitions in Poland and abroad, and at over 20 individual exhibitions. He made prints and projects, designs, painted and draw. His works are in the collections of National Museum in Warsaw, Kraków, Poznan, Szczecin, Pratt Center in New York, Kunsthalle in Bremen, Oslo Municipal Library, Allende Museum in Havana. He made also a project of mosaic on the fronton of Bagatela Theatre in Kraków, former Wanda Cinema and Apollo Cinema in Kraków, in Cinema in Grabowo. He made also a bas-relief of the Mother of God in ceramics in Church of All Nations in Jerusalem.

Awards
He was decorated with the Polonia Restituta Order, Gloria Artis Medal, Officer's Cross of Order Polonia Restituta, Knight's Cross of Order Polonia Restituta, Gold Cross of Merit. He was honoured with the Ministry of Culture and Art Award I and II level, the Ministry of Culture and National Heritage Award for the whole of activity, City of Kraków Award, Order of Kraków – European City of Culture, Gold Order of City of Kraków for Culture and Art, Honoris Gratia Order, Anniversary Order and Gold Order of ZPAP, Order of Benafactor of National Museum in Kraków, Award of the Rector of Academy of Fine Art in Kraków, 40th Anniversary of International Print Triennial in Kraków Order.

External links
 Official site of International Print Triennial Society in Kraków
 Site of International Print Triennial

Polish printmakers
1926 births
2009 deaths
Artists from Kraków
Knights of the Order of Polonia Restituta
Officers of the Order of Polonia Restituta
Commanders of the Order of Polonia Restituta
Recipients of the Silver Medal for Merit to Culture – Gloria Artis
Recipients of the Gold Cross of Merit (Poland)